Peter M. Busch (1934/1935 - April 10, 1986) was a U. S. Marine Corps officer and the 1984 Democratic nominee for United States Senate in Idaho.

Biography 
Peter M. Busch was born in 1934 or 1935. He was a U. S. Marine Corps fighter pilot during the Vietnam War. He flew in about 400 missions during the war and was shot down once. He retired from the Marine Corps as a lieutenant colonel in 1976. He ran for the United States Senate for Idaho as a Democrat in 1984. He was defeated by the Republican incumbent, Jim McClure, receiving just 26% of the vote. He moved from Lewiston to Caldwell in 1985 to help set up his campaign for the 1986 Idaho senatorial election.

Death 
On April 10, 1986, Busch was piloting his private airplane, a single-engine Piper, from Coeur D'Alene to a political convention in Idaho Falls. The weather was rainy with heavy fog patches. The plane crashed into a hillside near Dubois, and he, his wife, and former Idaho state senator and Democratic lieutenant governor candidate Terry Reilly, the latter two of whom were passengers, were all killed instantly. Busch and his wife were buried in Colton, Washington, on April 15.

References

1930s births
1986 deaths
Idaho Democrats

Year of birth missing
United States Marine Corps colonels
Aviators killed in aviation accidents or incidents in the United States